The 1978 United Bank Tennis Classic, also known as the Denver WCT, was a men's tennis tournament played on indoor carpet courts in Denver, Colorado in the United States that was part of the 1978 Grand Prix circuit. It was the seventh edition of the tournament and took place from February 20 through February 26, 1978. First-seeded Jimmy Connors won the singles title, his third at the event after 1975 and 1976.

Finals

Singles
 Jimmy Connors defeated  Stan Smith 6–2, 7–6
 It was Connors' 2nd singles title of the year and the 63rd of his career.

Doubles
 Bob Hewitt /  Frew McMillan defeated  Fred McNair /  Sherwood Stewart 6–3, 6–2

References

External links
 ITF tournament edition details

United Bank Classic
Indoor tennis tournaments
United Bank Classic
United Bank Classic
United Bank Classic